Robert 'Bob' Haworth (1 January 1879 - ?) was an English-born footballer who played as a centre half and right half in the 1890s and 1900s.

In the 1897–98 season he was on Darwen's books, before transferring to Blackburn Rovers, where he made 122 Football League appearances.
In the summer of 1904 he transferred to Fulham in the Southern Football League, and played 42 games for them before moving to Brentford in 1905.

References

External links
 Photo and bio at vintagefootballers.com

1879 births
Association football defenders
English Football League players
Darwen F.C. players
Blackburn Rovers F.C. players
Fulham F.C. players
Brentford F.C. players
Year of death missing
English footballers